The 2023 Philadelphia Phillies season will be the 141st season in the history of the franchise, and its 20th season at Citizens Bank Park.

Offseason

Player transactions

Players becoming free agents 

 Corey Knebel – Elected free agency on November 6, 2022.
 Chris Devenski – Agreed to a minor-league deal with the Los Angeles Angels on November 28, 2022.
 Kyle Gibson – Signed a one-year, $10 million contract with the Baltimore Orioles on December 5, 2021.
 David Robertson – Signed a one-year, $10 million contract with the New York Mets on December 9, 2022.
 Noah Syndergaard – Signed a one-year, $13 million contract with the Los Angeles Dodgers on December 16, 2022.
 Brad Hand – Elected free agency on November 6, 2022.
 Zach Eflin – Signed a three-year, $40 million contract with the Tampa Bay Rays on December 13, 2022.
 Jean Segura – Agreed to two-year, $17 million deal with the Miami Marlins on December 28, 2022.

Free agent acquisitions 
The first major move from the Phillies came on December 8, 2022, when they signed shortstop Trea Turner to an eleven-year, $300 million contract. 

After the blockbuster Turner deal, the Phillies spent the rest of December upgrading their pitching after losing several key pieces to free agency. On December 9, 2022, they signed left-hander Matt Strahm to a two-year, $15 million contract. A week later, they signed right-hander Taijuan Walker for four years on a $72 million contract. 

 Jake Cave – Claimed off of waivers on December 2, 2022
 Trea Turner – Signed an 11-year, $300 million contract on December 8, 2022
 Matt Strahm – Signed a 2-year, $15 million contract on December 9, 2022
 Taijuan Walker – Signed a 4-year, $72 million contract on December 16, 2022
 Josh Harrison – Signed a 1-year, $2 million contract on January 30, 2023

Trade acquisitions 
On January 7, 2023, the Phillies announced that they had traded outfielder Matt Vierling, utility player Nick Maton and catcher Donny Sands to the Detroit Tigers for relief pitcher Gregory Soto and infielder Kody Clemens.

On January 9, 2023, the Phillies acquired RHP Yunior Marte from the San Francisco Giants, trading away LHP Erik Miller.

Regular season

National League East

National League Playoff Leaders

Current roster

Game log

|- style="background:#
| 1 || March 30 || @ Rangers || – || || || — || || –
|- style="background:#
| 2 || April 1 || @ Rangers || – || || || — || || –
|- style="background:#
| 3 || April 2 || @ Rangers || – || || || — || || –
|- style="background:#
| 4 || April 3 || @ Yankees || – || || || — || || –
|- style="background:#
| 5 || April 4 || @ Yankees || – || || || — || || –
|- style="background:#
| 6 || April 5 || @ Yankees || – || || || — || || –
|- style="background:#
| 7 || April 6 || Reds || – || || || — || || –
|- style="background:#
| 8 || April 8 || Reds || – || || || — || || –
|- style="background:#
| 9 || April 9 || Reds || – || || || — || || –
|- style="background:#
| 10 || April 10 || Marlins || – || || || — || || –
|- style="background:#
| 11 || April 11 || Marlins || – || || || — || || –
|- style="background:#
| 12 || April 12 || Marlins || – || || || — || || –
|- style="background:#
| 13 || April 13 || @ Reds || – || || || — || || –
|- style="background:#
| 14 || April 14 || @ Reds || – || || || — || || –
|- style="background:#
| 15 || April 15 || @ Reds || – || || || — || || –
|- style="background:#
| 16 || April 16 || @ Reds || – || || || — || || –
|- style="background:#
| 17 || April 17 || @ White Sox || – || || || — || || –
|- style="background:#
| 18 || April 18 || @ White Sox || – || || || — || || –
|- style="background:#
| 19 || April 19 || @ White Sox || – || || || — || || –
|- style="background:#
| 20 || April 20 || Rockies || – || || || — || || –
|- style="background:#
| 21 || April 21 || Rockies || – || || || — || || –
|- style="background:#
| 22 || April 22 || Rockies || – || || || — || || –
|- style="background:#
| 23 || April 23 || Rockies || – || || || — || || –
|- style="background:#
| 24 || April 25 || Mariners || – || || || — || || –
|- style="background:#
| 25 || April 26 || Mariners || – || || || — || || –
|- style="background:#
| 26 || April 27 || Mariners || – || || || — || || –
|- style="background:#
| 27 || April 28 || @ Astros || – || || || — || || –
|- style="background:#
| 28 || April 29 || @ Astros || – || || || — || || –
|- style="background:#
| 29 || April 30 || @ Astros || – || || || — || || –
|-

|- style="background:#
| 30 || May 1 || @ Dodgers || – || || || — || || –
|- style="background:#
| 31 || May 2 || @ Dodgers || – || || || — || || –
|- style="background:#
| 32 || May 3 || @ Dodgers || – || || || — || || –
|- style="background:#
| 33 || May 5 || Red Sox || – || || || — || || –
|- style="background:#
| 34 || May 6 || Red Sox || – || || || — || || –
|- style="background:#
| 35 || May 7 || Red Sox || – || || || — || || –
|- style="background:#
| 36 || May 9 || Blue Jays || – || || || — || || –
|- style="background:#
| 37 || May 10 || Blue Jays || – || || || — || || –
|- style="background:#
| 38 || May 12 || @ Rockies || – || || || — || || –
|- style="background:#
| 39 || May 13 || @ Rockies || – || || || — || || –
|- style="background:#
| 40 || May 14 || @ Rockies || – || || || — || || –
|- style="background:#
| 41 || May 15 || @ Giants || – || || || — || || –
|- style="background:#
| 42 || May 16 || @ Giants || – || || || — || || –
|- style="background:#
| 43 || May 17 || @ Giants || – || || || — || || –
|- style="background:#
| 44 || May 19 || Cubs || – || || || — || || –
|- style="background:#
| 45 || May 20 || Cubs || – || || || — || || –
|- style="background:#
| 46 || May 21 || Cubs || – || || || — || || –
|- style="background:#
| 47 || May 22 || Diamondbacks || – || || || — || || –
|- style="background:#
| 48 || May 23 || Diamondbacks || – || || || — || || –
|- style="background:#
| 49 || May 24 || Diamondbacks || – || || || — || || –
|- style="background:#
| 50 || May 25 || @ Braves || – || || || — || || –
|- style="background:#
| 51 || May 26 || @ Braves || – || || || — || || –
|- style="background:#
| 52 || May 27 || @ Braves || – || || || — || || –
|- style="background:#
| 53 || May 28 || @ Braves || – || || || — || || –
|- style="background:#
| 54 || May 30 || @ Mets || – || || || — || || –
|- style="background:#
| 55 || May 31 || @ Mets || – || || || — || || –
|-

|- style="background:#
| 56 || June 1 || @ Mets || – || || || — || || –
|- style="background:#
| 57 || June 2 || @ Nationals || – || || || — || || –
|- style="background:#
| 58 || June 3 || @ Nationals || – || || || — || || –
|- style="background:#
| 59 || June 4 || @ Nationals || – || || || — || || –
|- style="background:#
| 60 || June 5 || Tigers || – || || || — || || –
|- style="background:#
| 61 || June 6 || Tigers || – || || || — || || –
|- style="background:#
| 62 || June 7 || Tigers || – || || || — || || –
|- style="background:#
| 63 || June 9 || Dodgers || – || || || — || || –
|- style="background:#
| 64 || June 10 || Dodgers || – || || || — || || –
|- style="background:#
| 65 || June 11 || Dodgers || – || || || — || || –
|- style="background:#
| 66 || June 12 || @ Diamondbacks || – || || || — || || –
|- style="background:#
| 67 || June 13 || @ Diamondbacks || – || || || — || || –
|- style="background:#
| 68 || June 14 || @ Diamondbacks || – || || || — || || –
|- style="background:#
| 69 || June 15 || @ Diamondbacks || – || || || — || || –
|- style="background:#
| 70 || June 16 || @ Athletics || – || || || — || || –
|- style="background:#
| 71 || June 17 || @ Athletics || – || || || — || || –
|- style="background:#
| 72 || June 18 || @ Athletics || – || || || — || || –
|- style="background:#
| 73 || June 20 || Braves || – || || || — || || –
|- style="background:#
| 74 || June 21 || Braves || – || || || — || || –
|- style="background:#
| 75 || June 22 || Braves || – || || || — || || –
|- style="background:#
| 76 || June 23 || Mets || – || || || — || || –
|- style="background:#
| 77 || June 24 || Mets || – || || || — || || –
|- style="background:#
| 78 || June 25 || Mets || – || || || — || || –
|- style="background:#
| 79 || June 27 || @ Cubs || – || || || — || || –
|- style="background:#
| 80 || June 28 || @ Cubs || – || || || — || || –
|- style="background:#
| 81 || June 29 || @ Cubs || – || || || — || || –
|- style="background:#
| 82 || June 30 || Nationals ||| – || || || — || || –
|-

|- style="background:#
| 83 || July 1 || Nationals || – || || || — || || –
|- style="background:#
| 84 || July 2 || Nationals || – || || || — || || –
|- style="background:#
| 85 || July 4 || @ Rays || – || || || — || || –
|- style="background:#
| 86 || July 5 || @ Rays || – || || || — || || –
|- style="background:#
| 87 || July 6 || @ Rays || – || || || — || || –
|- style="background:#
| 88 || July 7 || @ Marlins || – || || || — || || –
|- style="background:#
| 89 || July 8 || @ Marlins || – || || || — || || –
|- style="background:#
| 90 || July 9 || @ Marlins || – || || || — || || –
|- style="background:#bbcaff;"
| – || July 11 || colspan="7" | 2023 Major League Baseball All-Star Game at T-Mobile Park in Seattle
|- style="background:#
| 91 || July 14 || Padres || – || || || — || || –
|- style="background:#
| 92 || July 15  || Padres || – || || || — || || –
|- style="background:#
| 93 || July 15  || Padres || – || || || — || || –
|- style="background:#
| 94 || July 16 || Padres || – || || || — || || –
|- style="background:#
| 95 || July 18 || Brewers || – || || || — || || –
|- style="background:#
| 96 || July 19 || Brewers || – || || || — || || –
|- style="background:#
| 97 || July 20 || Brewers || – || || || — || || –
|- style="background:#
| 98 || July 21 || @ Guardians || – || || || — || || –
|- style="background:#
| 99 || July 22 || @ Guardians || – || || || — || || –
|- style="background:#
| 100 || July 23 || @ Guardians || – || || || — || || –
|- style="background:#
| 101 || July 24 || Orioles || – || || || — || || –
|- style="background:#
| 102 || July 25 || Orioles || – || || || — || || –
|- style="background:#
| 103 || July 26 || Orioles || – || || || — || || –
|- style="background:#
| 104 || July 28 || @ Pirates || – || || || — || || –
|- style="background:#
| 105 || July 29 || @ Pirates || – || || || — || || –
|- style="background:#
| 106 || July 30 || @ Pirates || – || || || — || || –
|- style="background:#
| 107 || July 31 || @ Marlins || – || || || — || || –
|-

|- style="background:#
| 108 || August 1 || @ Marlins || – || || || — || || –
|- style="background:#
| 109 || August 2 || @ Marlins || – || || || — || || –
|- style="background:#
| 110 || August 3 || @ Marlins || – || || || — || || –
|- style="background:#
| 111 || August 4 || Royals || – || || || — || || –
|- style="background:#
| 112 || August 5 || Royals || – || || || — || || –
|- style="background:#
| 113 || August 6 || Royals || – || || || — || || –
|- style="background:#
| 114 || August 7 || Nationals || – || || || — || || –
|- style="background:#
| 115 || August 8 || Nationals || – || || || — || || –
|- style="background:#
| 116 || August 9 || Nationals || – || || || — || || –
|- style="background:#
| 117 || August 10 || Nationals || – || || || — || || –
|- style="background:#
| 118 || August 11 || Twins || – || || || — || || –
|- style="background:#
| 119 || August 12 || Twins || – || || || — || || –
|- style="background:#
| 120 || August 13 || Twins || – || || || — || || –
|- style="background:#
| 121 || August 15 || @ Blue Jays || – || || || — || || –
|- style="background:#
| 122 || August 16 || @ Blue Jays || – || || || — || || –
|- style="background:#
| 123 || August 18 || @ Nationals || – || || || — || || –
|- style="background:#
| 124 || August 19 || @ Nationals || – || || || — || || –
|- style="background:#
| 125 || August 20 || @ Nationals || – || || || — || || –
|- style="background:#
| 126 || August 21 || Giants || – || || || — || || –
|- style="background:#
| 127 || August 22 || Giants || – || || || — || || –
|- style="background:#
| 128 || August 23 || Giants || – || || || — || || –
|- style="background:#
| 129 || August 25 || Cardinals || – || || || — || || –
|- style="background:#
| 130 || August 26 || Cardinals || – || || || — || || –
|- style="background:#
| 131 || August 27 || Cardinals || – || || || — || || –
|- style="background:#
| 132 || August 28 || Angels || – || || || — || || –
|- style="background:#
| 133 || August 29 || Angels || – || || || — || || –
|- style="background:#
| 134 || August 30 || Angels || – || || || — || || –
|-

|- style="background:#
| 135 || September 1 || @ Brewers || – || || || — || || –
|- style="background:#
| 136 || September 2 || @ Brewers || – || || || — || || –
|- style="background:#
| 137 || September 3 || @ Brewers || – || || || — || || –
|- style="background:#
| 138 || September 4 || @ Padres || – || || || — || || –
|- style="background:#
| 139 || September 5 || @ Padres || – || || || — || || –
|- style="background:#
| 140 || September 6 || @ Padres || – || || || — || || –
|- style="background:#
| 141 || September 8 || Marlins || – || || || — || || –
|- style="background:#
| 142 || September 9 || Marlins || – || || || — || || –
|- style="background:#
| 143 || September 10 || Marlins || – || || || — || || –
|- style="background:#
| 144 || September 12 || Braves || – || || || — || || –
|- style="background:#
| 145 || September 13 || Braves || – || || || — || || –
|- style="background:#
| 146 || September 14 || Braves || – || || || — || || –
|- style="background:#
| 147 || September 15 || @ Cardinals || – || || || — || || –
|- style="background:#
| 148 || September 16 || @ Cardinals || – || || || — || || –
|- style="background:#
| 149 || September 17 || @ Cardinals || – || || || — || || –
|- style="background:#
| 150 || September 18 || @ Braves || – || || || — || || –
|- style="background:#
| 151 || September 19 || @ Braves || – || || || — || || –
|- style="background:#
| 152 || September 20 || @ Braves || – || || || — || || –
|- style="background:#
| 153 || September 21 || Mets || – || || || — || || –
|- style="background:#
| 154 || September 22 || Mets || – || || || — || || –
|- style="background:#
| 155 || September 23 || Mets || – || || || — || || –
|- style="background:#
| 156 || September 24 || Mets || – || || || — || || –
|- style="background:#
| 157 || September 26 || Pirates || – || || || — || || –
|- style="background:#
| 158 || September 27 || Pirates || – || || || — || || –
|- style="background:#
| 159 || September 28 || Pirates || – || || || — || || –
|- style="background:#
| 160 || September 29 || @ Mets || – || || || — || || –
|- style="background:#
| 161 || September 30 || @ Mets || – || || || — || || –
|- style="background:#
| 162 || October 1 || @ Mets || – || || || — || || –
|-

Farm system

References

External links
 2023 Philadelphia Phillies season at Baseball Reference
 

Philadelphia Phillies seasons
Philadelphia Phillies
Philadelphia Phillies